Mary McQueen (13 July 1860–30 May 1945) was a New Zealand presbyterian deaconess, orphanage matron and social worker. She was born in Ballarat, Victoria, Australia on 13 July 1860.

References

1860 births
1945 deaths
New Zealand Presbyterians
New Zealand social workers